Alice Clark (c.1947 – April 2004) was an American soul singer, who had little commercial success but whose recordings became highly regarded.

Biography
Little is known publicly of her life outside her brief music career between 1968 and 1972.  She grew up in the Bedford-Stuyvesant neighborhood of Brooklyn, New York City.  According to Billy Vera, who wrote and produced her first record, "I got the impression her life wasn't that great.  She... had kids and belonged to a religious order that forbade either bathing or washing hair, I don't recall exactly which..."

Her first record, pairing two Vera songs, "You Got a Deal" and "Say You'll Never (Never Leave Me)", was recorded in 1968 at the Jubilee Records studio with musicians including Vera and Butch Mann (guitars), Jimmy Tyrell (bass), Earl Williams (drums), Money Johnson (trumpet) and others.  Produced by Vera, it was released on the Rainy Day label owned by Chip Taylor and Al Gorgoni.  Later the same year, Clark recorded "You Hit Me (Right Where It Hurt Me)" and "Heaven's Will (Must Be Obeyed)", both arranged by Richard Tee and produced by George Kerr.  Released on Warner Bros.-Seven Arts Records, "You Hit Me" – co-written by Sylvia Moy and first recorded by Kim Weston at Motown – was not a hit at the time.

In 1972, Bob Shad of Mainstream Records signed Clark to record an LP with arranger Ernie Wilkins.  Produced by Shad, the album, Alice Clark, was recorded at the Record Plant in New York and included three songs written by Bobby Hebb, as well as Jimmy Webb's "I Keep It Hid" – also issued as a single – Juanita Fleming's "Never Did I Stop Loving You", and John Bromley and Petula Clark's "Looking at Life".   The session musicians on the album included guitarist Cornell Dupree, keyboardist Paul Griffin, and drummer Bernard Purdie.  Again, the records were unsuccessful, and Clark made no more recordings.

She retired from the music industry after the commercial failure of the album, and returned to family life in Bedford-Stuyvesant.  She died from cancer in 2004, aged 57.

Legacy
In Britain, "You Hit Me (Right Where It Hurt Me)" became a staple of the Northern soul scene in the early 1970s, valued both for its rarity and its quality as "a classic piece of uptown soul".  Her album also became highly valued and collectable, later claimed as "delivered with understated passion and appealing vulnerability", "astonishing", "sublime", "perhaps one of the finest soul albums ever recorded" and "the Holy Grail of modern soul", in which "every single element - the singer, the songs, the musicians, the production - are simply superb...[and] the whole is even greater than the sum of the parts."

A compilation of her recordings was released on compact disc in 2010, and her eponymous LP was reissued on vinyl in 2019. Additionally, her song "Never Did I Stop Loving You" was featured in the 2020 movie The King of Staten Island.

References

1940s births
2004 deaths
American soul musicians
20th-century African-American women singers
Northern soul musicians
People from Bedford–Stuyvesant, Brooklyn
20th-century American women singers
20th-century American singers
21st-century African-American people
21st-century African-American women